José Guerrero de Torres, O.E.S.A. (21 February 1641 – 26 March 1720) was a Roman Catholic prelate who served as Bishop of Gaeta (1693–1720).

Biography
José Guerrero de Torres was born in Antequera, Spain on 21 February 1641 and ordained a priest in the Order of Hermits of Saint Augustine.
On 13 April 1693, he was appointed Bishop of Gaeta by Pope Innocent XII.
On 18 April 1693, he was consecrated bishop by Paluzzo Paluzzi Altieri Degli Albertoni, Cardinal-Bishop of Palestrina, with Prospero Bottini, Titular Archbishop of Myra, and Domenico Antonio Bernardini, Bishop of Castellaneta, serving as co-consecrators. 
He served as Bishop of Gaeta until his death on 26 March 1720.

References

External links and additional sources
 (for Chronology of Bishops) 
 (for Chronology of Bishops) 

17th-century Italian Roman Catholic bishops
18th-century Italian Roman Catholic bishops
Bishops appointed by Pope Innocent XII
1641 births
1720 deaths